Mengi is a common masculine Turkish given name. It means "eternal", "without a beginning", "having no beginning". It is an Oghuz accented version of Mengü which is also a Turkish given name. Compared to Mengü, Mengi has an additional meaning: "happy".

People
 Cemil Mengi, a Turkish footballer playing in Türkiyemspor Berlin.
 Ramazan Mengi, founder of Mengi Yay.
 Ruhat Mengi, Adyghe origined Turkish journalist.
 Zeynep Mengi, former writer of Hayvan Dergisi and journalist working at Hürriyet.
 Güngör Mengi, former editor-in-chief of Sabah.
 Mengü Timur, khan of the Golden Horde in 1266-1280..
 Tuda Mengü, khan of the Golden Horde from 1280-1287

See also 
 Mongke (disambiguation), the Mongolian equivalent

Turkish masculine given names